Goodenia viridula is a species of flowering plant in the family Goodeniaceae and is endemic to a restricted area of Queensland. It is an erect undershrub with linear leaves and spikes of greenish yellow flowers.

Description
Flowering occurs from November to May.

Taxonomy and naming
Goodenia viridula was first formally described in 1990 by Roger Charles Carolin in the journal Telopea from a specimen collected by Lindsay Stuart Smith and Selwyn Lawrence Everist near Jericho in 1940. The specific epithet (viridula) means "greenish", referring to the colour of the corolla.

Distribution
This goodenia grows in open woodland and heath and is only known from near Jericho in Queensland.

Conservation status
Goodenia viridula is classified as of "least concern" under the Queensland Government Nature Conservation Act 1992.

References

viridula
Flora of Queensland
Plants described in 1990
Taxa named by Roger Charles Carolin